Champagne-Ardenne is a former administrative region of France, located in the northeast of the country, bordering Belgium. Mostly corresponding to the historic province of Champagne, the region is known for its sparkling white wine of the same name.

History
The administrative region was formed in 1956, consisting of the four departments Aube, Ardennes, Haute-Marne, and Marne. On 1 January 2016, it merged with the neighboring regions of Alsace and Lorraine to form the new region Grand Est, thereby ceasing to exist as an independent entity.

Geography
Its rivers, most of which flow west, include the Seine, the Marne, and the Aisne. The Meuse flows north.

Transportation

Highways
 A4 connecting Paris and Strasbourg and serving the Reims metropolitan area
 A5 connecting Paris and Dijon and serving Troyes and Chaumont
 A26 connecting Calais and Troyes and serving Reims and Châlons-en-Champagne
 A34 connecting Reims and the Belgian border and serving Charleville-Mézières

Rail
The rail network includes the Paris–Strasbourg line, which follows the Marne Valley and serves Épernay, Châlons-en-Champagne, and Vitry-le-François. The LGV Est TGV line also connecting Paris and Strasbourg opened in 2007 and serves Reims with a train station in the commune of Bezannes.

Water
The region's canals include the Canal latéral à la Marne and Marne-Rhine Canal, the latter connecting to the Marne at Vitry-le-François. These are petit gabarit canals.

Air
The airport is in a sparsely populated area just  from Paris.

Economy

 61.4% of its land is dedicated to agriculture
 1st in France for the production of barley and alfalfa
 2nd in France for the production of beets, onions, and peas
 3rd in France for the production of tender wheat and rapeseed.
 282.37 km2 of vineyards
 Champagne sales in 2001: 263 million bottles (4% increase from 2000) of which 37.6% were exported.
 25% of French hosiery production
 3rd metallurgic region in France

Businesses
 Verreries Mécaniques de Champagne
 Produits Métallurgiques à Reims
 Vallou

Food processing
 Champagne-Céréales
 France-Luzerne
 Béghin-Say

Demographics
The population of Champagne-Ardenne has been in steady decrease since 1982 due to a rural exodus. With 1.3 million people and a density of 52/km2, it is one of France's least populated regions. After a brief period of stabilization in the 1990s, the region's population is now among the fastest "dying" in Europe, with several municipalities losing people at a faster rate than a lot of Eastern European areas, especially in the Haute-Marne department. The region is among the oldest in France, has a weak fertility rate, and its immigrant population, while growing, is still minimal compared to the national average.

Major communities

 Châlons-en-Champagne
 Charleville-Mézières
 Chaumont
 Épernay
 Reims
 Saint-Dizier
 Sedan
 Troyes

See also

 Ardennes
 Champagne Riots
 Champagne (historical province)

References

External links
  https://web.archive.org/web/20061013154125/http://www.cr-champagne-ardenne.fr/
  
 

 
Former regions of France
NUTS 2 statistical regions of the European Union
1956 establishments in France
States and territories established in 1956
2015 disestablishments in France
States and territories disestablished in 2015